Yaw Donkor (died 2016), also known as Nkomode, was a Ghanaian comedian who featured in a TV program known as Concert Party, a soap opera.

Filmography 

 Key Soap Concert Party

References

2016 deaths